Jim Ryan may refer to:

Sports
Jim Ryan (linebacker) (born 1957), American football player
Jim Ryan (American football coach) (born 1975), American football coach
Jim Ryan (Australian footballer) (1918–2006), Australian rules footballer
Jim Ryan (footballer, born 1942), Welsh football (soccer) player
Jim Ryan (footballer, born 1945), Scottish football (soccer) player

Others
Jim Ryan (politician) (1946–2022), American politician from Illinois
Jim Ryan (reporter) (born 1939), reporter and television anchorman from New York
Jim Ryan (writer) (born 1936), American screenwriter
Jim Ryan, president of Sony Interactive Entertainment

See also
Jim Ryun (born 1947), American former track athlete and politician
James Ryan (disambiguation)
Jimmy Ryan (disambiguation)
Ryan (surname)